Dactyloceras nebulosum is a moth in the family Brahmaeidae. It was described by Ulrich Brosch, Stefan Naumann and Frank Meister in 2002. It is found in Cameroon.

References

Endemic fauna of Cameroon
Brahmaeidae
Moths described in 2002